Events from the year 1759 in Ireland.

Incumbent
Monarch: George II

Events
Restrictions on import of Irish cattle into England are removed.
Henry Flood enters the Parliament of Ireland as a member for Kilkenny.
Planned French Invasion of Britain: France considers offering the Kingdom of Ireland to a Stuart pretender.
Formation of the Irish Catholic Committee, of Dublin merchants and professionals loyal to the British monarchy.
31 December – Arthur Guinness leases the St. James's Gate Brewery in Dublin.

Arts and literature
West front of Trinity College Dublin on College Green completed by architects Henry Keene and John Sanderson.

Births
5 March – Thomas Bray, Roman Catholic Archbishop of Cashel (died 1820).
9 September – Hercules Taylour, soldier and politician (died 1790).
Adam Buck, miniaturist and portrait painter (died 1833 in London).
James Craig, politician (died 1833).
Charles Osborne, lawyer and politician (died 1817).
Approximate date
Sir James Galbraith, 1st Baronet, politician (died 1827).
Robert Philson, soldier and politician in the United States (died 1831).

Deaths
16 February – Bartholomew Mosse, surgeon, impresario, founded the Rotunda Hospital in Dublin (born 1712).
Richard Pockrich, inventor of the Angelic organ (born c. 1690).
Henry Singleton, judge (born 1682).

References

 
Years of the 18th century in Ireland
Ireland
1750s in Ireland